The 1st constituency of Drôme is a French legislative constituency in the Drôme département.

Deputies

Election results

2022

 
 
 
 
 
 
 
 
|-
| colspan="8" bgcolor="#E9E9E9"|
|-

2017

2012

2007

Sources
 Official results of French elections from 1998: 
 Official results of French elections from 2017: 

1